Noto v. United States, 367 U.S. 290 (1961), was a 1961 United States Supreme Court case that reversed the felony conviction of a lower-echelon official of the Communist Party USA (CPUSA).

Background
John Francis Noto of Buffalo, New York, was the chairman of the CPUSA for upstate New York. According to officials of the Federal Bureau of Investigation, Noto "went underground" in 1951. A grand jury issued a secret indictment for his arrest in November 1954 and he was taken into custody on August 31, 1955 He was convicted of a felony in federal District Court in Rochester in 1956 under the membership clause of the Smith Act, which made membership in an organization that advocates the violent overthrow of the United States government a felony. He was sentenced to five years in prison. He challenged the constitutionality of that clause on appeal. The Court of Appeals affirmed his conviction on December 31, 1958, and with respect to the membership clause said: "Clearly this is not a prosecution of membership per se but of membership with knowledge and criminal intent."

Decision
The Supreme Court case reversed Noto's conviction on June 5, 1961, in a unanimous decision, finding that the evidence presented at trial was not sufficient to demonstrate that the Party was advocating action to cause the forcible overthrow of the government.

Justice Harlan wrote:

Justices Black and Douglas wrote concurring opinions that argued that the Court should have gone further and ruled that the membership clause of the Smith Act was unconstitutional. Douglas wrote that "the utterances, attitudes, and associations in this case ... are, in my view, wholly protected by the First Amendment, and not subject to inquiry, examination, or prosecution by the Federal Government." Black characterized Harlan's review of the inadequacy of the trial testimony sarcastically:

On the same day, the Court upheld a provision of the Internal Security Act of 1950 that required "Communist action" organizations to register with the government, which subjected their members to a variety of restrictions. Observers assessed the Court's sustaining the membership clause of the Smith Act in that light. Anthony Lewis wrote in the New York Times: "The court's opinions were carefully limited and did not give the government a blank check in applying the two statutes. Nevertheless, the decisions were substantial victories for the governmentthe most important legal victories it has had in the internal security field in many years."

See also
Dennis v. United States, 
Scales v. United States, 
Yates v. United States, 
 Smith Act trials of communist party leaders

References

External links

 

1961 in United States case law
United States Supreme Court cases
United States Free Speech Clause case law
United States due process case law
McCarthyism
Communist Party USA litigation
United States Supreme Court cases of the Warren Court

zh:丹尼斯诉合众国案